Ntighuzo Amairi is a community in Obingwa local government area of Abia State. It is one of the communities that make up the Eastern Ngwa region. They speak the Ngwa dialect of the Ngwa people.

References 

Populated places in Abia State
Villages in Igboland